The Land is a 2016 American drama film written and directed by Steven Caple Jr. The film stars Jorge Lendeborg Jr., Moisés Arias, Rafi Gavron, Ezri Walker, Kim Coates, Linda Emond, Natalie Martinez, Machine Gun Kelly, Erykah Badu and Michael K. Williams. The film was released on July 29, 2016, by IFC Films.

Premise
Four Cleveland teens dream of escaping inner-city poverty and becoming pro skateboarders, but a car heist puts them on the radar of a local queenpin.

Cast
Jorge Lendeborg Jr. as Cisco
Moisés Arias as Junior
Rafi Gavron as Patty Cake
Ezri Walker as Boobie
Kim Coates as Uncle Steve 
Linda Emond as Momma 
Natalie Martinez as Evelyn 
Machine Gun Kelly as Slick
Erykah Badu as Turquoise 
Michael K. Williams as Pops 
Robert Hunter as Elliot
Michael Ray Escamilla as Chino
Melvin Gregg as Brent
Christopher Amitrano as Hassan
Nadia Simms as Stacey
Ashleigh Morghan as Janice
Ryan Mulkay as Harry
Tom Kondilas as Henry Bush Tits

Reception
The review aggregator website Rotten Tomatoes gives the film an approval rating of 70%, based on 20 reviews. On Metacritic, the film has a score of 50 out of 100, based on 10 critics, indicating "mixed or average reviews".

Release
The film premiered at the 2016 Sundance Film Festival on January 26, 2016. The film was released on July 29, 2016, by IFC Films.

References

External links
 

2016 films
2016 drama films
American drama films
Films directed by Steven Caple Jr.
Films set in Cleveland
Films shot in Cleveland
2016 directorial debut films
2010s English-language films
2010s American films